Anthony Deron Heygood (born April 3, 1986) is a former American football linebacker. He was signed by the Carolina Panthers as an undrafted free agent in 2009. He played college football at Purdue.

He has also been a member of the Seattle Seahawks and Saskatchewan Roughriders.

Early years
Heygood attended Cardinal O'Hara High School in Springfield, Pennsylvania.

Heygood committed to Purdue University on February 4, 2004. Heygood was heavily recruited, landing FBS scholarships from Boston College, Notre Dame, Purdue Syracuse, West Virginia & Wisconsin.

College career
Heygood majored in health and fitness at Purdue.

Professional career

Carolina Panthers
After going undrafted in the 2009 NFL Draft, Heygood was signed by the Carolina Panthers on May 1, 2009 as an undrafted free agent. He waived on September 5, 2009.

Seattle Seahawks
Heygood was signed by the Seattle Seahawks on January 6, 2010. He was later released by the team on July 29, 2010 only to be re-signed five days later on August 4. He was placed on injured reserve on August 6, 2010. On July 30, 2011, he was waived by Seattle.

Saskatchewan Roughriders
In May 2013, Heygood signed with the Saskatchewan Roughriders. Heygood was cut on June 18, 2013.

References

External links

Purdue Boilermakers bio
Seattle Seahawks bio

1986 births
Living people
Players of American football from Pennsylvania
American football linebackers
Purdue Boilermakers football players
Carolina Panthers players
Seattle Seahawks players
Saskatchewan Roughriders players